Pakistan International Airlines (PIA) cricket team was a first-class cricket side sponsored by the national flag carrier, Pakistan International Airlines (PIA), and was based in Karachi before its disestablishment in 2020. They have won the Quaid-i-Azam Trophy more times than anyone else.

They played their first first-class match in 1960-61, under the captaincy of Hanif Mohammad. As of late 2013, they have played 387 first-class matches, with 149 wins, 64 losses and 174 draws.

Honours
Qaid-i-Azam Trophy (6)
 1969-70
 1979-80

 1987-88
 1989-90
 1999-2000
 2002-03
 2011-12

National One Day Championship (11)
 1980–81
 1981–82
 1982–83
 1985–86 
 1987-88
 1995–96 
 1999–2000
 2001–02
 2002–03
 2008–09
 2011–12 Division One

Notable players
 Imran Khan
 Asif Mujtaba
 Anil Dalpat
 Wasim Akram
 Zaheer Abbas
 Wasim Bari
 Shoaib Akhtar
 Mohammad Yousuf
 Shoaib Malik
 Abdul Razzaq
 Najaf Shah
 Yasir Hameed
 Umar Gul
 Sarfaraz Ahmed
 Moin Khan
 Saqlain Mushtaq

References

External links
 Lists of matches played by Pakistan International Airlines at CricketArchive
 Cricinfo

1960 establishments in Pakistan
Pakistani first-class cricket teams
Pakistan International Airlines
Cricket clubs established in 1960
Sports clubs disestablished in 2020
2020 disestablishments in Pakistan